Brother André is a Canadian biographical drama film, directed by Jean-Claude Labrecque and released in 1987. The film centres on the life of André Bessette (Marc Legault), a Roman Catholic lay brother who was widely credited with many miraculous healings, centring in particular on his interaction with his niece Marie-Esther (Sylvie Ferlatte) following a Eucharistic Congress in 1910.

The film's cast also includes Jean Coutu, Raymond Cloutier, André Cailloux, Michel Cailloux, René Caron, Guy Provost, Guy Thauvette, Linda Sorgini and Guillaume Lemay-Thivierge.

The film received three Genie Award nominations at the 9th Genie Awards in 1988, for Best Art Direction/Production Design (Ronald Fauteux), Best Costume Design (Denis Sperdouklis) and Best Sound Editing (Diane Boucher, Marcel Pothier, Viateur Paiement, Jo Caron and Antoine Morin).

References

External links
 

1987 films
1980s biographical drama films
Canadian biographical drama films
Films directed by Jean-Claude Labrecque
1987 drama films
French-language Canadian films
1980s Canadian films
1980s French-language films